In for the Kill! is the fourth studio album by Welsh rock band Budgie. It was released through MCA Records in May 1974. The album includes the song "Crash Course in Brain Surgery", originally released in 1971 as a single. The song was covered by Metallica for their 1987 EP The $5.98 E.P. - Garage Days Re-Revisited, while the album's title track was covered by Van Halen during the group's club days.

Track listing

Personnel 
Budgie
Burke Shelley - bass guitar, vocals
Tony Bourge - guitar
Pete Boot - drums

Production staff
Budgie - producer
Rodger Bain - producer for "Crash Course In Brain Surgery"
Kingsley Ward - engineer
Pat Moran - engineer

Charts

References

Budgie (band) albums
1974 albums
MCA Records albums
Albums recorded at Rockfield Studios